The 2018 Women's PSA World Series Finals is the women's edition of the PSA World Series Finals (Prize money : $160 000). The top 8 players in the 2017–18 PSA World Series are qualified for the event. The event will take place in Dubai in the United Arab Emirates from 5 to 9 June 2018.

Nour El Sherbini won its first PSA World Series Finals title after defeating fellow countrywoman Raneem El Weleily 3–1 in the Final.

Seeds

Group stage results
Times are Gulf Standard Time

Group A

Standings

Group B

Standings

Semifinals & Final

See also
2018 Men's PSA World Series Finals
2017–18 PSA World Series
PSA World Series Finals
2017 PSA World Tour
2018 PSA World Tour

References

External links
PSA World Series Finals at PSA website
PSA World Series Finals official website

W
PSA World Tour
2018 in women's squash